The 61st Division of the Philippine Army was an infantry division from the 1930s to 1942.

In late 1941, there were two regular and ten reserve divisions in the Army of the Philippines, with about 100,000 to 300,000 active troops and officers in the general headquarters, camps in Manila and across the provinces of the Philippines. Among them were the Visayan-Mindanao Force under Colonel William F. Sharp in the southern islands (61st, 81st, and 101st Infantry Divisions plus three other infantry regiments), and the Reserve Force.

The 61st Division was commanded by BGen. Bradford G. Chynoweth (USA), and the division Chief of Staff was Col. Albert F. Christie, Inf.  These officers and others went into captivity after the Corregidor surrender; Gen. Chynoweth survived three and-a-half years of horrible conditions as a P.O.W.

The resistance movement on Panay was unique. It developed rapidly ; there was a minimum of discord; and a dynamic leader emerged at an early time. The guerrilla structure on Panay was built around a core of refugee troops of the Philippine 61st Division who had taken to the hills immediately after the surrender orders were published. Scarcely ten weeks after the Japanese invasion, Colonel Macario Peralta, Jr., former G-3 of the division and a man of strong and driving character, assumed undisputed control of the main guerrilla groups. The early emergence of a generally accepted leader and the availability of a relatively large amount of salvaged supplies and equipment gave a powerful impetus to the formation of a smoothly working guerrilla command.

The first reactivated Philippine military district commanders were appointed in February 1943. LCol. Peralta was given command of the 6th Military District on Panay. He already exercised considerable influence over adjacent islands, and thus was given temporary control over the 7th and 8th Districts of Negros and Cebu. The small guerrilla bands on Masbate, Marinduque, Mindoro, and Palawan, having no outstanding leaders of their own, remained under the domination of the 6th Military District. Colonel Peralta soon developed one of the most extensive and efficient intelligence systems in the Philippines.

Units
61st Division:
HQ 61st Division: ABMC Lists 1 dead
61st Field Artillery Regiment: ABMC lists 4 dead
61st Infantry Regiment: ABMC lists 1 dead
62nd Infantry Regiment: ABMC lists 4 dead
63rd Infantry Regiment: ABMC Lists 1 dead

Order of battle
 61st Infantry Regiment (PA) (Col. Eugene H. Mitchell, Inf.) 
 62nd Infantry Regiment (PA) (LCol. Allen Thayer) (transf. to 102nd Division (PA)) 
 63rd Infantry Regiment (PA) 
 64th Provisional Infantry Regiment (PA) 
 65th Provisional Infantry Regiment (PA) 
 61st Field Artillery Regiment (PA) (Col. Hiram W. Tarkington, FA) (transf. to 102nd Division (PA))
 61st FA Regt HQ Company 
 1st Bn/61st FA Regt (PA) (75mm guns, 8x) 
 2nd Bn/61st FA Regt (PA) (2.95-inch pack howitzers, 12x)  
 3rd Bn/61st FA Regt (PA)  
 61st Engineer Battalion (PA) 
 61st Division Units  
 61st Division Headquarters & HQ Company
 61st Medical Battalion
 61st Signal Company
 61st Quartermaster Company (Motorized) 
 61st QM Transport Company (Truck)

Sources

Bibliography
Morton, Louis. The Fall of the Philippines (Publication 5-2) . Retrieved on 14 Feb 2017.

See also

Macario Peralta Jr.
Ludovico Arroyo Bañas

References

Infantry divisions of the Philippines
Military units and formations disestablished in 1942